Mohamed Farouk (born 14 September 1989 in Cairo) is an Egyptian footballer who plays for Pyramids in the Egyptian Premier League. He made his international debut with Egypt under Shawky Gharib on 5 March 2014 in a match against Bosnia and Herzegovina. He wore the jersey number 22 in Al-Ahly after the retirement of Mohamed Aboutrika.

References

External links
 

1989 births
Living people
Egyptian footballers
Egypt international footballers
Al Mokawloon Al Arab SC players
Al Ahly SC players
Wadi Degla SC players
El Entag El Harby SC players
Pyramids FC players
Association football forwards